Vinaři (Winemakers) is a Czech television series from Prima televize. It is set in South Moravia and was broadcast by Prima station from 31 August 2014 to 13 December 2015. It was written by Petr Kolečko. This is the third series of this television in 2014.[4] The first season had a total of 16 episodes, which aired from late August to mid-December 2014 every Sunday in prime time. The subtitle reads: "A series about wine and the people around it". The opening song "Wine" is performed by the band Chinaski. On 9 June 2015, the preparation of the second season was confirmed, and the broadcast of which began on 30 August of the same year. With the transfer of the story from South Moravia to Polabí, the opening song also underwent textual changes.

The second season of the series was nominated for the Czech Lion in the category Best Dramatic TV Series, but did not win the award.

Cast
Václav Postránecký as Bedřich Pavlíček
Tereza Kostková as Kateřina Hýsková
Miroslav Táborský as Jan Fuksa
Jitka Smutná as Stázi Pavlíčková
Hynek Čermák as František Vlček
Zdeněk Junák as Olin Vlček
Pavel Liška as Miroslav Tomica
Jan Brožek as Bedřich „Buddy“ Hýsek
Alžběta Vaculčiaková as Petra Hýsková
Anna Fialová as Julie Vlčková
Pavel Nečas as Patrik Tauš
Lucie Benešová as Hedvika Taušová
Tomáš Materna as Michal Tauš
Oldřich Navrátil as Vladimír Luža
Tomáš Matonoha as Jakub „Hřéba“ Hřebec
Lukáš Langmajer as „Machr“ Macháček
Robert Nebřenský as Ludvík „Luis“ König
Jana Paulová as Jiřina Straková
Radim Novák as Pepan
Jakub Uličník as Eduard
Jitka Čvančarová as Jana Hamplová
Leoš Noha as Chrudoš
Pavel Šimčík as „Hrouda“
Petr Vaněk as Láďa Karas
Jiří Vyorálek as Waldemar
Zuzana Norisová as Monika Waldemarová
Eliška Křenková as Klára Hamplová
Vojtěch Záveský as Jožin Chrudoš
Johana Freywaldová as Gábina Karasová
Anežka Rusevová as Sumečková
Marek Taclík as Zdeněk Barták
Laďka Něrgešová as Jaruna Bartáková
Ester Kočičková as Jitka Zelenková
Vojtěch Machuta as Venoušek Zelenka
Lenka Jurošková as Blanka Zelenková

References

External links 
 
 
 ČSFD site

2014 Czech television series debuts
2015 Czech television series endings
Czech comedy television series
Prima televize original programming